The mangrove blue flycatcher (Cyornis rufigastra) is a species of bird in the family Muscicapidae.
It is native to Brunei, Indonesia, Malaysia, the Philippines, Singapore, and Thailand.
Its natural habitat is subtropical or tropical mangrove forests. Clements splits the Kalao blue flycatcher, Cyornis kalaoensis into a distinct species.  The IOC still lists it as a subspecies of the mangrove blue flycatcher.

References

mangrove blue flycatcher
Birds of Malesia
mangrove blue flycatcher
Taxonomy articles created by Polbot